"Here in the Real World" is a song co-written and recorded by American country music artist Alan Jackson.  It was released in January 1990 as the second single and title track from his debut album Here in the Real World, and in early 1990 it became his first Top 10 country hit.  The song reached a peak of number 3 on the U.S. Billboard Hot Country Singles & Tracks charts, and number 1 on the Canadian RPM Top Country Tracks charts.  Jackson wrote the song with Mark Irwin.

Content
The song is a mid-tempo piece, firmly in the neotraditional style, backed by fiddle and steel-string acoustic guitar, in which the narrator observes the difference between an idealized movie situation and the real world, saying "If life were like the movies, I'd never be blue". In the chorus, he observes that "here in the real world, it's not that easy at all / 'Cause when hearts get broken, it's real tears that fall."

Critical reception
Kevin John Coyne of Country Universe gave the song an A grade," calling the conceit "bloody well brilliant, what with the juxtaposition of reality and fiction, but none of its intelligence would matter without the heartbroke sincerity that gives it its simplicity." An uncredited review from Cash Box magazine was also positive, praising the neotraditionalist country sound and saying that Jackson "gives us incredible lyrics with just the right hooks. This cut offers a strong sense of comfort and a vocal range that’s totally soothing."

Music video
The music video was directed by Jim May and premiered in early 1990. It begins with a retro-style title card, features mostly Jackson performing, and closes with a brief snippet of Gene Autry singing "Back in the Saddle Again."

Covers
Glen Campbell recorded the song on his 1994 album Glen Campbell Live! His Greatest Hits
George Jones recorded this song on his last solo album, Hits I Missed...And One I Didn't
Charley Pride recorded the song on his 1991 album Classics With Pride

Chart positions

Year-end charts

References

1990 singles
Alan Jackson songs
Charley Pride songs
Glen Campbell songs
George Jones songs
Songs written by Mark Irwin (songwriter)
Songs written by Alan Jackson
Song recordings produced by Scott Hendricks
Song recordings produced by Keith Stegall
Arista Nashville singles
1990 songs